MIAT Mongolian Airlines Flight 557 was a scheduled domestic passenger flight in Mongolia from Ulaanbaatar to Mörön. On 21 September 1995, the Antonov An-24 crashed on approach to Mörön, killing 41 of the 42 people on board. The crash is the deadliest aviation accident to occur in Mongolia.

Aircraft 
The An-24PB (serial and construction numbers 57310103 and 101-03 respectively) was built by Antonov Serial Production Plant in 1975 and delivered to МIAT Mongolian Airlines in the then Mongolian's People's Republic, with registration BNMAU-10103. In May 1995, the registration was changed to МТ-1008, although it was never applied to the aircraft.

Accident 
The aircraft was operating a flight from Ulaanbaatar to Mörön, carrying 37 passengers and six crew. En route, the crew decided that visibility was sufficient enough to switch to visual flight, and during the approach the pilots switched to VFR and began descending too soon. Around 12:30 the aircraft struck a mountain at Choho Geologloh Uul, killing all six crew members and 36 of the 37 passengers. The sole survivor was passenger Ulziibayar Sanjaa.

References 

Airliner accidents and incidents involving controlled flight into terrain
Aviation accidents and incidents in 1995
Accidents and incidents involving the Antonov An-24
1995 in Mongolia
September 1995 events in Asia
Airliner accidents and incidents caused by pilot error